Mihail Popovici (born 29 October 1942 in Podoima) is a Moldavian specialist in cardiology who was selected as a member of Academy of Science of Moldova. He is the director of Moldavian Institute of Cardiology from Chisinau.

References

1942 births
Living people
Moldovan cardiologists
Physicians from Chișinău
Soviet cardiologists